The 16th Ordinary General Assembly of the Synod of Bishops, commonly referred to as the synod on synodality, is an upcoming  synod of bishops of the Catholic Church which will conclude in October 2024 and has as its theme "For a synodal Church: communion, participation and mission".

The date of the synod was first announced as October 2022, but was then changed to October 2023 because the scope of the synod had been widened. A further extension was announced in October 2022, taking the closing date to October 2024.

Background

From the beginning of his papacy, Pope Francis expressed his desire to strengthen the collegial aspects of the Church's governance, and he argued for more recognition of charismatic gifts in the Church. On September 15, 2018, Francis approved the new apostolic constitution Episcopalis communio (Episcopal communion). The constitution states that the Synod's final document, if approved by the members with "moral unanimity" and, if the Pope has "granted deliberative power to the Synod Assembly", becomes part of the ordinary Magisterium of Catholic teaching "once it has been ratified and promulgated by him". The new constitution also provides for the laity to send their contributions directly to the synod's secretary general. Some analysts surmise that the greatest achievement of Francis' papacy may be his creation of a more synodal Catholic church, where synods serve as a platform for open and energetic debate.

Preparation 
Pope Francis announced the Synod on Synodality on March 7, 2020.

On 24 May 2019, Nathalie Becquart was appointed, along with four other women and one man, as consultor to the general secretariat of the Synod of Bishops in the Catholic Church. It is the first time for women to be appointed to that position. Becquart saw the appointment as a part of Pope Francis's effort "to implement synodality at every level of the Church’s life" and to benefit from the important contribution that women can make. Becquart proposed a symbolic step of asking a woman to lead the retreat for the Roman Curia one year. On 6 February 2021, Pope Francis appointed Becquart as an undersecretary of the Synod of Bishops, making her the first woman to have the right to vote in the Catholic Synod of Bishops.

Cardinal Mario Grech, secretary-general of the Synod of Bishops, said that the synod was not like a parliament, where one sides stands to gain as the other loses. It is also not as important who has a vote on the final document, he said, as much as Catholics around the world "dialogue, converse, discern together in order to" find consensus.

Synodality
Several months before announcing the synod, Pope Francis said that "Synodality is a style, it is a walk together, and it is what the Lord expects from the Church of the third millennium." According to the International Theological Commission, synodality is "the action of the Spirit in the communion of the Body of Christ and in the missionary journey of the People of God." It is more commonly understood as a process by which the Church undergoes discernment on a variety of issues. Aided by the Holy Spirit, the laity, priests, bishops, and religious each use their own gifts and charisms to help the Church make decisions. The notion of the Church as "synodal" by its very nature requires "careful theological clarification," according to the Commission, as it is a relatively new concept.

Preparatory documents
In September 2021, the Vatican released a preparatory document and "handbook" to dioceses around the world to help them prepare for the synod. According to the document:

The purpose of this synod is not to produce more documents. Rather, it is intended to inspire people to dream about the church we are called to be, to make people's hopes flourish, to stimulate trust, to bind up wounds, to weave new and deeper relationships, to learn from one another, to build bridges, to enlighten minds, warm hearts, and restore strength to our hands for our common mission."

The handbook offers guidance to bishops for how to solicit the thoughts of lay Catholics, as well as non-Catholics and non-Christians, particularly those on the margins of society. It includes a number of questions and discussion prompts in 10 general themes to help promote reflection and the collection of input from a wide variety of stakeholders. The most basic question, according to the document, is "How does this 'journeying together', which takes place today on different levels -- from the local level to the universal one -- allow the church to proclaim the Gospel in accordance with the mission entrusted to her; and what steps does the Spirit invite us to take in order to grow as a synodal church?" Several of the suggested questions include:

To whom does our particular church 'need to listen to'" and "how are the laity, especially young people and women, listened to?
How do we integrate the contribution of consecrated men and women? 
What space is there for the voice of minorities, the discarded, and the excluded? 
Do we identify prejudices and stereotypes that hinder our listening? 
How do we listen to the social and cultural context in which we live?

A prayer used at Councils, Synods and other Church gatherings for hundreds of years, opening words Adsumus, Sancte Spiritus (We stand before You, Holy Spirit) has been adopted for use in advance of synod-related gatherings and services.

Diocesan phase

Pope Francis officially opened the synodal process on 10 October 2021 at the Vatican. The diocesan phase ran from October 2021 to April 2022.

In England and Wales, the diocesan phase ran from November 2021 to March 2022. The local bishops noted that the participation of lay people in a synod was "unprecedented". The bishops published a National Synthesis Document on 22 June 2022 drawing together the emerging conclusions of this phase, in preparation for the next, continental, phase of the process.

The Irish Catholic bishops published a National Synthesis Document in August 2022 following a similar process across the 22 Irish dioceses.

Continental phase
The continental phase will extend from September 2022 to March 2023. The European Continental Synodal Assembly is scheduled to take place in Prague from 5 to 12 February 2023. For the North American Continental Stage, 10 virtual assemblies will take place during December 2022 and January 2023, with a continental synthesis due for completion by 31 March 2023.

Concluding phase
The final, universal phase will commence with the October 2023 XVI Ordinary General Assembly of the Synod of Bishops taking place at the Vatican, but it will continue until October 2024.

See also
 Synod of Bishops in the Catholic Church
Fifteenth Ordinary General Assembly of the Synod of Bishops
Fourteenth Ordinary General Assembly of the Synod of Bishops
Synodal Path

References

Works cited
 .

External links
 

Synod of bishops in the Catholic Church
2021 in Vatican City
2022 in Vatican City
2023 in Vatican City
21st-century Catholicism
Pope Francis